Big dynorphin is an endogenous opioid peptide of the dynorphin family that is composed of both dynorphin A and dynorphin B. Big dynorphin has the amino acid sequence: Tyr-Gly-Gly-Phe-Leu-Arg-Arg-Ile-Arg-Pro-Lys-Leu-Lys-Trp-Asp-Asn-Gln-Lys-Arg-Tyr-Gly-Gly-Phe-Leu-Arg-Arg-Gln-Phe-Lys-Val-Val-Thr. It has nociceptive and anxiolytic-like properties, as well as effects on memory in mice. 

Big dynorphin is a principal endogenous agonist at the human kappa-opioid receptor.

References

Neuropeptides
Kappa-opioid receptor agonists
Opioid peptides